Wachuku may refer to:

Josaiah Ndubuisi Wachuku, Nigerian royalty 
Jaja Wachuku (1918–1996), Nigerian governmental official 
Chuku Wachuku (born 1947), US-educated Nigerian economist 
Nwabueze Jaja Wachuku (born 1954), Nigerian-born United Kingdom-based lawyer